The following is a list of the number-one albums of 2017 on the weekly Billboard China V Chart.

Criteria

Chart entry criteria 

There is no time limit imposed for (domestic) albums released within mainland China. For the album still sells on the Yin Yue Shopping Mall, the album is eligible to be ranked in the weekly album chart. The classification of albums into mainland and foreign albums depend on the country/location the album was released and not the language.

Structure 

The chart cycle for real time chart is updated hourly and the weekly and yearly album charts are updated every month and year respectively.

The real time chart shows only ranking without the number of sales.

The weekly chart shows only the top50 ranking albums in the month and the number of sales for only the top5 albums.

The yearly chart shows only the top50 ranking albums in the year and its number of sales. The chart is published for the subsequent year on 1 January.

Loop holes 

 Pre-order sales for a specific album will only be counted on the release date. 
 If a single album is divided into multiple editions, the sales will be counted separately.

Chart history

References 

YinYueTai
China V Chart
China V Chart
Chinese music industry
China
China V Chart Albums 2017